Fomikhinsky is a rural locality (a khutor) in Srednetsaritsynskoye Rural Settlement, Serafimovichsky District, Volgograd Oblast, Russia. The population was 91 as of 2010. There are 8 streets.

Geography 
Fomikhinsky is located 31 km southwest of Serafimovich (the district's administrative centre) by road. Karagichev is the nearest rural locality.

References 

Rural localities in Serafimovichsky District